The Allentown Jets were a minor league basketball team that played in the Eastern Professional Basketball League (later the Eastern Basketball Association and Continental Basketball Association) from 1958 to 1981. The team was one of the most successful franchises in CBA/Eastern League history, winning eight playoff championships and 12 division titles.

Originally formed in 1957 as the Wilmington Jets, the team relocated in 1958 to Allentown, Pennsylvania.  Among the Jets' top players were center Roman "Big Daddy" Turmon, Ray Scott NBA player and coach, scorer-rebounder Harthorne Wingo and 3-point specialist Brendan McCann.  The Delaware Sports Museum and Hall of Fame inducted Richard Koffenberger, who played for the team in Wilmington.  The Jets had a working agreement with the New York Knicks, who sent several players to Allentown for playing time.
Scott was the fourth player picked in the US in the 1961 NBA draft by the Detroit Pistons, the Jets PR maestro, Johnny Kimock navigated this successful transition making the Jets one of the elite EBL teams.
In 1964, the Jets played an interleague contest with the Grand Rapids Tackers of the Midwest Professional Basketball League. The Jets won 138–136, winning the only minor league "World Series of Basketball" interpromotional game ever held.

In 1979, the franchise rebranded itself as the "Lehigh Valley Jets," in an effort to greater regionalize its fanbase; however, after the 1980–81 season the Jets closed up for good.

Year-by-year

References

External links
Continental Basketball Association franchise history
Delaware Stars
First State Fusion
Wilmington Bombers
List of professional sports teams in Delaware

Basketball teams established in 1957
Sports clubs disestablished in 1981
Defunct basketball teams in the United States
Continental Basketball Association teams
Sports in Allentown, Pennsylvania
Basketball teams in Pennsylvania
Defunct basketball teams in Pennsylvania
Sports in Wilmington, Delaware
Basketball teams in Delaware
1957 establishments in Delaware
1981 disestablishments in Pennsylvania